Uscana may refer to:
 Uscana, an ancient city of the Illyrian tribe Penestae
 Uscana (wasp), a wasp genus in the family Trichogrammatidae